Blonde from Brooklyn is a 1945 American musical comedy film directed by Del Lord and starring Bob Haymes, Lynn Merrick, Thurston Hall, and Mary Treen. The film was released by Columbia Pictures on June 21, 1945.

Plot
Returning soldier Dixon Harper meets cute with promising radio singer Susan Parker. Susan is mistaken for a heiress to a southern plantation by blustery colonel Farnsworth and she ignores wise cracking friend Diane to see the ruse through.

Cast 

Bob Haymes as Dixon Harper (as Robert Stanton)
Lynn Merrick as Susan Parker aka Susanna Bellwithers
Thurston Hall as 'Colonel' Hubert Farnsworth
Mary Treen as Diane Peabody
Eddie Bartell as Ricky Lester (uncredited)
Hugh Beaumont as Lieutenant (uncredited)
Carlyle Blackwell Jr. as Serviceman (uncredited)
Chester Clute as Mr. Weams (uncredited)
Dick Curtis as Soldier (uncredited)
Myrtle Ferguson as Miss Quackenfish (uncredited)
Byron Foulger as Harvey (uncredited)
Chuck Hamilton as Reporter (uncredited)
Tom Hanlon as Announcer (uncredited)
Hugh Hooker as Serviceman (uncredited)
Marilyn Johnson as WAC (uncredited)
John Kelly as Bartender (uncredited)
Arthur Loft as Daniel Frazier (uncredited)
Anne Loos as Secretary (uncredited)
Robert Love as Serviceman (uncredited)
Alphonse Martell as Maitre'd (uncredited)
William Newell as Waiter (uncredited)
Leighton Noble as Leighton Noble, Orchestra Leader (uncredited)
Joe Palma as Reporter (uncredited)
Bert Roach as Drunk (uncredited)
Wally Rose as Serviceman (uncredited)
Walter Soderling as W. Wilson Wilbur (uncredited)
Brick Sullivan as Reporter (uncredited)
LeRoy Taylor as Sailor (uncredited)
Gwen Verdon as Girl in Nightclub (uncredited)
Regina Wallace as Mrs. Frazier (uncredited)
Matt Willis as Curtis Rossmore (uncredited)
Dick Winslow as Orchestra Leader (uncredited)

References

External links

1945 musical comedy films
American musical comedy films
1945 films
Columbia Pictures films
American black-and-white films
Films directed by Del Lord
1940s American films
1940s English-language films